James Carter Welsh (May 8, 1931 – December 23, 1963) was an American rower. He competed in the men's coxless four event at the 1952 Summer Olympics.

Personal life
Welsh graduated from the United States Naval Academy in 1953 and rose to the rank of captain. On December 23, 1963, he died of injuries sustained in the crash of a U-6A Beaver.

References

External links
 

1931 births
1963 deaths
American male rowers
Aviators killed in aviation accidents or incidents
Olympic rowers of the United States
Rowers at the 1952 Summer Olympics
People from Harvey, Illinois
United States Naval Academy alumni
United States Navy officers
United States Naval Aviators
Victims of aviation accidents or incidents in 1963
Victims of aviation accidents or incidents in the Philippines
Military personnel from Illinois